Mionica is a town and municipality located in the Kolubara District of western Serbia. , the population of the town is 1,571, while population of the municipality is 14,263 inhabitants.

Geography
While the Serbs make up for a large majority of the population, the Roma make up a significant minority, while there are smaller populations of ethnic Montenegrins, Croats, Hungarians, Macedonians, Slovenians, Germans and Albanians.

Demographics

According to the 2011 census results, the municipality of Mionica has 14,335 inhabitants.

Ethnic groups
The ethnic composition of the municipality:

Economy
Mionica's economy is predominantly agricultural. Its primary activities are the fruit orchards and raising cattle. The municipality is also a tourist destination, especially the Ribnica river, well known for sight-seeing and outdoor sports, such as fishing and hunting. The Vrujci spa also attracts tourists and is known for its bottled water.

The following table gives a preview of total number of employed people per their core activity (as of 2017):

Education
In Mionica there is one primary school, and Economy high school, a community health clinic and a culture center with a movie theater attached to it.

Gallery

Twin cities

Notable people
 Nikola Grbović
 Boban Janković
 Miodrag Ješić
 Živojin Mišić

See also
 Subdivisions of Serbia

References

External links 

 Official website

Populated places in Kolubara District
Municipalities and cities of Šumadija and Western Serbia
Open-air museums in Serbia